Simon Alexander Amin (born 13 November 1997) is a professional footballer of who plays for Sandefjord and the Syria national team. Born in Sweden, he represents Syria internationally.

International career
Born in Sweden, he is of Assyrian descent. He was called up to represent the senior Syria national team for the 2022 FIFA World Cup qualification on 5 June 2021.

References

1997 births
Living people
Sportspeople from Örebro
Swedish footballers
Swedish people of Syrian descent
Syrian footballers
Syria international footballers
Assyrian footballers
Syrian Christians
Karlslunds IF players
Örebro SK players
Trelleborgs FF players
Allsvenskan players
Association football midfielders